Mary McCaffree may refer to:
 Mary Ellen McCaffree, member of the Washington House of Representatives
 Mary Jane McCaffree, White House Social Secretary during the Eisenhower administration